Colorado State Highway 160 may refer to:
U.S. Route 160 in Colorado, the only Colorado highway numbered 160 since 1968
Colorado State Highway 160 (pre-1968) west of Boulder, now part of SH 72